Pradiphat Road is a road in Bangkok, Thailand, mainly in Phaya Thai sub-district, Phaya Thai district. Pradiphat is a straight road.

Route 
It begins at Saphan Daeng intersection in the area of Thanon Nakhon Chai Si sub-district. It cuts Rama V, Techa Wanit, Thahan roads and the Saphan Daeng (Daeng bridge). It runs past the northern railway line (between Sam Sen and Bang Sue stations) at Thoet Damri intersection, where it cuts Thoet Damri and Kamphaeng Phet 5 roads. It crosses Khlong Prapa (water supply canal) and cuts Rama VI road beneath the expressway. It ends at Saphan Khwai intersection, where it meets Phahonyothin and Saliratthawiphak roads.

History 
Pradiphat is one of the oldest streets of Bangkok. It was originally named "Patiphat Phuban Road" (ถนนปฏิพัทธ์ภูบาล). 

During the Vietnam War era (70–60s), this road was very busy especially at night. It was home to several hotels and pubs serving G.I., including the accommodation of these soldiers as well.

On June 24, 1932 at 5:00 am, Phraya Songsuradej met with his conspirators at the intersection with the northern railway line (presently Thoet Damri intersection) to finalize the revolutionary plan (Siamese revolution of 1932). The road runs only  from his house next to the present's Government Savings Bank, Pradiphat Road branch.

Transport 
Pradiphat road is served by bus lines: 3, 67, 90, 97, 117, 524.

References 

Neighbourhoods of Bangkok
Dusit district
Streets in Bangkok
Phaya Thai district